Events from the year 1650 in art.

Events
 Giovanni Angelo Canini is received into the Accademia di San Luca of Rome
 Pieter van Bredael enters the Guild of Saint Luke in Antwerp.
 Govert Dircksz Camphuysen becomes a poorter and moves from Jordaan to Kalverstraat

Paintings 

Bartolomeo Biscaino, Adoration of the Magi
Claude Lorrain
Coast Scene with the landing of Aeneas
View of La Crescenza
Gerard Dou – The Dutch Housewife
Aniello Falcone – The Anchorite
David Ryckaert – Temptation of St. Anthony
Aernout van der Neer – Moonlit Landscape with Bridge (1648–50)
Gerard van Honthorst – Portrait of Frederick Henry, Prince of Orange
Diego Velázquez – approximate completion date
Portrait of Innocent X
Portrait of Juan de Pareja
Helmich van Thweenhuysen II - Portrait of a Clergyman

Births
January 11 - Diana Glauber, Dutch-German painter (died 1721)
April 16 - Jean Joly, French sculptor (died 1740)
April 20 - Felice Boselli, Italian painter, active mainly in Piacenza (died 1732)
October - Jan Mortel, Dutch painter (died 1719)
date unknown
Rinaldo Botti, Italian painter born in Florence (died unknown)
Jean-Baptiste Boyer d’Éguilles, French engraver, painter, and collector (died 1709)
Margherita Caffi, Italian woman painter of Still lifes of flowers and fruit (died 1710)
Bernardino Ciceri, Italian painter (died unknown)
Jean Cornu, French sculptor (died 1710/1715)
Francisco de Artiga, Spanish landscape and historical painter (died 1711)
Alessandro Mari, Italian painter of capricci and symbolical representations (died 1707)
Carlo Moscatiello, Italian painter of quadratura (died 1739)
Giovanni Francesco Venturini, Italian painter and engraver (died 1710)
Huang Ding, Chinese landscape painter and poet during the Qing Dynasty (died 1730)
probable
Valerio Baldassari, Italian painter (died 1695)
Domenico Maria Bonavera, Italian engraver (died unknown)
Giovanni Canti, Italian] painter of the Baroque (died 1716)
Jan Kryštof Liška, Czech Baroque painter (died 1712)
Garret Morphey, Irish painter of portraits, genre works and landscapes (died 1716)
John Slezer, Dutch- or German-born military engineer and artist (died 1717)
Jan van der Vaardt, Dutch painter of portraits, landscapes and trompe-l'œil (died 1727)

Deaths
January 17 – Tommaso Dolabella, Venetian painter (born 1570)
January 18 – Matteo Rosselli, Italian painter (born 1578)
June 19 – Matthäus Merian, Swiss engraver (born 1593)
July 20 – Iwasa Matabei, Japanese painter (born 1578)
December – Jacob Pynas, Dutch Golden Age painter (born 1583)
date unknown
Giovanni Battista Barbiani, Italian painter of the Baroque period (born 1593)
Giovanni Battista Barca, Italian painter (born 1594)
Giovanni Campino, Italian painter from Camerino (born 1590)
Martin Droeshout, English engraver (born 1601)
Nicodemo Ferrucci, Italian painter (born 1574)
Guy François, French painter (born c.1578)
Baltazar Kuncz, Polish sculptor and woodcarver (born 1580)
Jean Nicolle, French painter (born 1610)
Antonio Randa, Italian painter active in Ferrara (born unknown)
Bartholomeus Strobel, Silesian Baroque painter (born 1591)
Pietro Testa, Italian High Baroque artist (born 1611)
Gerrit van Bloclant, Dutch Renaissance painter (born 1578)
Alessandro Vitali, Italian painter of the late-Renaissance and Baroque periods (born 1580)

References

 
Years of the 17th century in art
1650s in art